This page details the format and usage of telephone numbers in Slovakia. Today, Slovakia uses a closed numbering plan with area codes beginning with 0. After 0, there is usually a 2-digit prefix, followed by a 7-digit subscriber number. The capital, Bratislava, has one-digit prefix and an 8-digit subscriber number.

Following the break-up of Czechoslovakia in 1993, the successor states, the Czech Republic and Slovakia, continued to share the 42 country code, until 28 February 1997, when the Czech Republic adopted 420 while Slovakia adopted 421.

Numbering plan

Special codes (emergency calls) 
The following special telephone numbers are valid across the country:

112 - General emergency
150 - Fire brigade
155 - Ambulance
158 - Police
159 - Municipal police

These numbers are toll-free.

References
Slovak phone area codes : http://www.centroconsult.sk/toolbox/phonemap.html

Telecommunications in Slovakia
Slovakia
Telephone numbers